Alice Lamb (born 5 October 1984) plays for Great Britain women's national ice hockey team as defenceman.

References

1984 births
Living people
British women's ice hockey players
British women's ice hockey defencemen